Only When I Laugh is a British television sitcom made by Yorkshire Television for ITV.  It aired between 29 October 1979 and 16 December 1982 and was set in the ward of an NHS hospital. The title is in response to the question, "Does it hurt?".

It starred James Bolam, Peter Bowles, and Christopher Strauli as patients Roy Figgis, Archie Glover, and Norman Binns. Mr. Gordon Thorpe, their consultant surgeon, was played by Richard Wilson; and Gupte, the staff nurse from Delhi, was played by Derrick Branche.

The show was one of many successes for writer Eric Chappell, and has been repeated on ITV4 since 2019, formerly on ITV3.

Production
Only When I Laugh was written after Eric Chappell was commissioned by Yorkshire Television to write another sitcom following the success of Rising Damp. Chappell devised the premise of a hospital comedy from the patients' perspective as he felt that previous television based in a hospital setting focused on the doctors, nurses and staff. In an interview with the Liverpool Echo in 1979, Chappell said of the three main characters, "They all come from different backgrounds. They differ in class and politics and they're all different in their attitude to being in hospital. That's what gives the vital chemistry for the comedy."

Only When I Laugh marked James Bolam's return to situation comedy following his success with The Likely Lads. The actor told the Evening Express in 1979, "I'm thoroughly enjoying making the series. We have had a lot of fun. Eric Chappell is a smashing writer with a very distinctive style and brilliantly clever lines. Hospital comedies have been done before but this is different in that it is seen from the patients' point of view."

Reception
In a discussion of Eric Chappell's work in The Guinness Book of Classic British TV,
Only When I Laugh was described as "intermittently rewarding".

Cast
James Bolam as Roy Figgis
Peter Bowles as Archie Glover
Christopher Strauli as Norman Binns
Richard Wilson as Gordon Thorpe
Derrick Branche as Gupte

Guest appearances have been made by Gwen Taylor, John Quayle, Neil McCarthy, Patrick Troughton, Moira Lister, Pat Ashton, Neil Connery, Pamela Cundell, Brenda Cowling, Reginald Marsh, Rosalind Ayres, Ann Beach, Mary Tamm, Karl Howman, Isla Blair, Ronnie Stevens, Stephen Greif, Robert Gillespie, Sylvia Kay and Frank Middlemass.

Episodes

Series 1 (1979)

Series 2 (1980)

Series 3 (1981)

Christmas Special (1981)

Series 4 (1982)

Home media
In region 2 all four series of Only When I Laugh have been released on DVD by Network DVD, and a complete series box set has also been released both with music edits.
In region 1 series 1 & 2 have been released in individual DVDs. A complete 5 disc box set was released on 10 March 2009 by Dep Distribution under license from ITV Studios and distributed by Vivendi Entertainment.
Region 4, first the Complete Box Set was released in 2008, followed by the individual seasons in 2010. The 1981 Christmas Special is not featured on any Region 4 DVD.

 Only When I Laugh (Season 1-4) - April 12, 2008
 Only When I Laugh: Season 1 - June 9, 2010
 Only When I Laugh: Season 2 - June 9, 2010
 Only When I Laugh: Season 3 - September 8, 2010
 Only When I Laugh: Season 4 - September 8, 2010

References

External links

1979 British television series debuts
1982 British television series endings
1970s British sitcoms
1980s British sitcoms
English-language television shows
ITV sitcoms
Television series by Yorkshire Television
Television shows set in Yorkshire
Television series by ITV Studios